2022–23 Iran Football's 2nd Division  is the 22nd under 2nd Division since its establishment (current format) in 2001. The season featured 21 teams from the 2nd Division 2021–22, three new team relegated from the 2021–22 Azadegan League: Vista Toorbin Tehran, Shahin Bushehr, Machine Sazi Tabriz, and four new teams promoted from the 3rd Division 2021–22: Ario Bam Eslamshahr, Panik Talesh, Foolad Hormozgan and Damash Gilan. The draw for the league was held on 13 September 2022.
These changes has been applied before the season:

Teams

Stadia and locations

Number of teams by region

League table

Group A

Group B

See also
 2022–23 Persian Gulf Pro League
 2022–23 Azadegan League
 2022–23 3rd Division
 2022–23 Hazfi Cup
 2022 Iranian Super Cup

References

League 2 (Iran) seasons